The following is a list of all finals of the Romanian football cup competition called Cupa României.

Results of the Finals

See also
List of Romanian football champions

Notes
(II) – Clubs representing Divizia B at the moment of the final.
(III) – Clubs representing Divizia C at the moment of the final.

References